Ronald E. F. Eddy (born ) is a politician in Ontario, Canada. He was a Liberal member of the Legislative Assembly of Ontario from 1992 to 1995. He represented the riding of Brant—Haldimand, and the mayor of the County of Brant from 1999 to 2018.

Background
Eddy was born in Toronto, Ontario and raised on a farm near Brantford. He worked as a farmer and municipal administrator. He was a clerk-administrator in Wentworth County, Ontario from 1955 to 1973, and for Middlesex County from 1974 to 1992. He was reeve of South Dumfries Township from 1978 to 1991, and was a councillor in Brant County. On one occasion, he served as president of the Association of Municipalities of Ontario. In 1990, Eddy was president of an international plowing competition.

Politics
He was elected to the Ontario legislature in a by-election held on March 5, 1992, following the resignation of former Liberal leader Robert Nixon in Brant—Haldimand. Eddy was elected over Progressive Conservative candidate David Timms by almost 5,000 votes.

The Progressive Conservatives won a majority government in the 1995 provincial election, and Eddy lost his seat to PC candidate Peter Preston by about 3,500 votes.

In 1999, Eddy returned to municipal politics and became the mayor of the County of Brant.  He also serves on the board of directors for Brant County Power and is vice-president of the Children's Aid Society of Brant. Eddy lost re-election to businessman David Bailey in 2018.

Electoral record

References

External links
 

1931 births
Living people
Mayors of places in Ontario
Ontario Liberal Party MPPs
People from the County of Brant